Bulldog Drummond (1922) was the first film adaptation of the Bulldog Drummond fictional character, starring Carlyle Blackwell Sr. and Evelyn Greeley, and directed by Oscar Apfel. The story was adapted by B. E. Doxat-Pratt and produced by Maurits Binger.

Cast
 Carlyle Blackwell as Hugh Drummond
 Evelyn Greeley as Phyllis Benton
 Dorothy Fane as Irma Peterson
 Warwick Ward as Dr. Lakington
 Willem van der Veer as Carl Peterson (as Horace de Vere)
 Gerald Dean as Algy Longworth
 Harry Bogarth as Sparring Partner
 William Browning as James Handley

Production
Bulldog Drummond was filmed in the Netherlands.

Survival status
It is unknown whether any recording of the film survives, so it may be a lost film.

References

External links

 
 
 
 
 Bulldog Drummond (1922) at SilentEra
 

Films based on Bulldog Drummond
1922 films
British mystery films
British silent feature films
British black-and-white films
Films directed by Oscar Apfel
1922 mystery films
1920s British films
Silent mystery films
Silent thriller films